The Cabinet of Léon Faucher, in which Léon Faucher was the leading minister, was formed on 10 April 1851 by President Louis-Napoleon Bonaparte.
It followed the Petit ministère of 1851.
The cabinet was a compromise between the Parti de l'Ordre and the Bonapartists in the period before the coup d'état of 2 December 1851.
The cabinet was replaced by the Last cabinet of the French Second Republic on 26 October 1851.

Ministers
The ministers were:

References

Sources

French governments
1851 establishments in France
1851 disestablishments in France
Cabinets established in 1851
Cabinets disestablished in 1851